Timothy Mwitwa (21 May 1968 – 27 April 1993) was a Zambian professional footballer who played as a forward. He was a member of the Zambia national team. He was among those killed in the crash of the team plane in Gabon in 1993.

Career
Timothy Mwitwa started his playing career at Kabwe Rangers FC, a club run by the Kabwe Municipal Council, before attending trials at the "Magnificent" Kabwe Warriors FC in 1986 and got picked under the tutelage of late Godfrey "Ucar" Chitalu as coach of the club. Mwitwa was part of the Kabwe Warriors team that won their first Zambian Super league championship in 15 years in the 1987 soccer season but got demoted the following year. The club also won the Champion of Champions Cup the same season under coach Bizwell Phiri. 

Mwitwa featured for the Kabwe Warriors squad that participated in the African Cup of Champions Clubs in 1988, where they were knocked out in the second round by Al Hilal of Sudan. Mwitwa was sent off early on in the first half of the second leg tie in Omdurman, with Warriors going on to lose 3–1, having held Al Hilal 0–0 in the first leg in Kabwe.

Warriors played in the lower first division in the 1988 season, losing only one game to Monze Swallows and were promoted right back to the Super Division the following year. Most soccer pundits expected Warriors to lose most of their star players (including Mwitwa, goal keeper Richard Mwanza, defenders Whiteson Changwe, Samuel Chomba and James Chitalu among others) but the club managed to hold on to all their players, a feat that is attributed to their promotion at first attempt.
 
Mwitwa later played club football for Nkana F.C. in Zambia making only a few appearances in the 1993 season before the Gabon tragedy. He is regarded as one of the finest talents to have ever emerged from Kabwe town as well as Kabwe Warriors football club, hence his nicknames "Teacher" and Tim "Tiger".   In 1990, he joined AC Sparta Prague where he appeared in seven Czechoslovak First League matches.

Mwitwa made several appearances for the Zambia national team and participated in the 1990 and 1992 African Cup of Nations finals.

References

External links

1968 births
1993 deaths
Zambian footballers
Association football forwards
Zambia international footballers
1990 African Cup of Nations players
1992 African Cup of Nations players
Nkana F.C. players
AC Sparta Prague players
Zambian expatriate footballers
Expatriate footballers in Czechoslovakia
Victims of aviation accidents or incidents in Gabon
Footballers killed in the 1993 Zambia national football team plane crash